For the airport with the ICAO code KRNP, see Owosso Community Airport

KRNP (100.7 FM) is a classic rock formatted broadcast radio station licensed to Sutherland, Nebraska, serving the North Platte/Ogallala area. KRNP is owned and operated by Eagle Communications, Inc.

On October 20, 2020, KRNP changed their format from active rock to classic rock, branded as "Flat Rock 100.7".

References

External links
Flat Rock 100.7 Online

2007 establishments in Nebraska
Classic rock radio stations in the United States
Radio stations established in 2007
RNP